Homer Daniel Angell (January 12, 1875 – March 31, 1968) was a Republican U.S. congressman from Oregon, serving eight terms from 1939 to 1955.

Biography 
Angell was born on a farm near The Dalles, Oregon in 1875. He received his undergraduate degree from the University of Oregon in 1900 and his law degree from Columbia University in 1903, after which he returned to Portland to begin his law practice.

Political career 
He was elected to the Oregon House of Representatives in 1929, 1931, and 1935 and the Oregon State Senate in 1937. He resigned that seat in 1938 to run for the United States House of Representatives, representing Oregon's 3rd congressional district. Angell was elected and served eight terms. In 1954, Angell was defeated for the Republican nomination by future Oregon governor Tom McCall.

Personal
Angell's first wife was Mayme Henton Angell; they married in 1908.  She died in 1951 after a long illness.
Angell married his long-time secretary Margaret Clagget after 1951, shortly before being sworn in for his seventh term.

Following his surprise defeat in the 1954 Republican primary by journalist and future Oregon governor Tom McCall, Angell retired from politics and returned to Portland, where he remained active in the community until his death in 1968. He is interred at the Portland Memorial Funeral Home and Mausoleum.

References

This article incorporates material from the public domain Biographical Directory of the United States Congress.

External links

1875 births
1968 deaths
Members of the Oregon House of Representatives
Oregon state senators
People from The Dalles, Oregon
University of Oregon alumni
Columbia Law School alumni
Portland, Oregon Republicans
Republican Party members of the United States House of Representatives from Oregon